Edmund Fritz (before 1918after 1932) was an Austrian (possibly Hungarian-born) actor, film director, and manager of at least one musical group.

He was co-director of the 1918 film Alraune, a Hungarian science fiction horror film, believed to be lost.

He appeared in the 1930 film Die singenden Babies (English: The Singing Babies), believed to be lost, which may also have featured his female vocal group Singing Babies (AKA Die Singing Babies von Edmund Fritz, and Edmund Fritz's Singing Babies; see Viennese Singing Sisters).

He appeared in the 1931 Otto Preminger film Die große Liebe (English: The Great Love). Die Singing Babies von Edmund Fritz appeared in the same film.

In 1932, Edmund Fritz's Singing Babies recorded the 78rpm single "Wir sind ja heut' so glücklich" / "An der schönen blauen Donau" (Odeon A 161216).

References

External links 
 

Place of birth missing
Year of birth missing
Place of death missing
Year of death missing
20th-century Austrian male actors
Austrian film directors
Austrian music managers